The 431st Maryland General Assembly convened in a regular session on January 8, 2014, and adjourned sine die on April 7, 2014.

Senate

Party composition

Senate leadership

Membership

Notes
 This Senator was originally appointed to office by the Governor to fill an open seat.

 The President of the Senate does not serve on any of the four standing legislative committees. He does, however, serve on both the Executive Nominations and the Rules Committees.

House of Delegates

Party composition

House leadership

Membership

Notes

2014 in Maryland
Maryland legislative sessions